Nifurzide is a nitrofuran derivative and intestinal anti-infectious agent active against Escherichia coli.

References 

Thiophenes
Hydrazides
Nitrofurans